Statistics of the Scottish Football League in season 1922–23.

Scottish League Division One

Scottish League Division Two

See also
1922–23 in Scottish football

References

 
Scottish Football League seasons